Sedum palmeri is a species of plant in the family Crassulaceae native to Mexico with persistent light green leaves, becoming marked in red during winter.

The plant is about 30 cm high and 40 cm wide, and forms a rounded cushion with leaves arranged in rosettes located at the tips of stems.
The abundant golden yellow flowers bloom in spring.

Sedum palmeri is often cultivated as an ornemental succulent.

References

External links

palmeri
Taxa named by Sereno Watson